Calcium chloride is an inorganic compound, a salt with the chemical formula . It is a white crystalline solid at room temperature, and it is highly soluble in water. It can be created by neutralising hydrochloric acid with calcium hydroxide.

Calcium chloride is commonly encountered as a hydrated solid with generic formula , where n = 0, 1, 2, 4, and 6. These compounds are mainly used for de-icing and dust control. Because the anhydrous salt is hydroscopic and deliquescent, it is used as a desiccant.

Uses

De-icing and freezing-point depression

By depressing the freezing point of water, calcium chloride is used to prevent ice formation and is used to de-ice. This application consumes the greatest amount of calcium chloride. Calcium chloride is relatively harmless to plants and soil. As a deicing agent, it is much more effective at lower temperatures than sodium chloride. When distributed for this use, it usually takes the form of small, white spheres a few millimeters in diameter, called prills. Solutions of calcium chloride can prevent freezing at temperatures as low as −52 °C (−62 °F), making it ideal for filling agricultural implement tires as a liquid ballast, aiding traction in cold climates.

It is also used in domestic and industrial chemical air dehumidifiers.

Road surfacing

The second largest application of calcium chloride exploits its hygroscopic nature and the tackiness of its hydrates; calcium chloride is highly hygroscopic and its hydration is an exothermic process. A concentrated solution keeps a liquid layer on the surface of dirt roads, which suppresses the formation of dust. It keeps the finer dust particles on the road, providing a cushioning layer. If these are allowed to blow away, the large aggregate begins to shift around and the road breaks down. Using calcium chloride reduces the need for grading by as much as 50% and the need for fill-in materials as much as 80%.

Food
The average intake of calcium chloride as food additives has been estimated to be 160–345 mg/day. Calcium chloride is permitted as a food additive in the European Union for use as a sequestrant and firming agent with the E number E509. It is considered as generally recognized as safe (GRAS) by the U.S. Food and Drug Administration. Its use in organic crop production is generally prohibited under the US National Organic Program.

As a firming agent, calcium chloride is used in canned vegetables, in firming soybean curds into tofu and in producing a caviar substitute from vegetable or fruit juices. It is commonly used as an electrolyte in sports drinks and other beverages, including bottled water. The extremely salty taste of calcium chloride is used to flavor pickles without increasing the food's sodium content. Calcium chloride's freezing-point depression properties are used to slow the freezing of the caramel in caramel-filled chocolate bars. Also, it is frequently added to sliced apples to maintain texture.

In brewing beer, calcium chloride is sometimes used to correct mineral deficiencies in the brewing water. It affects flavor and chemical reactions during the brewing process, and can also affect yeast function during fermentation.

In cheesemaking, calcium chloride is sometimes added to processed (pasteurized/homogenized) milk to restore the natural balance between calcium and protein in casein. It is added before the coagulant.

Calcium chloride is used to prevent cork spot and bitter pit on apples by spraying on the tree during the late growing season.

Laboratory and related drying operations
Drying tubes are frequently packed with calcium chloride. Kelp is dried with calcium chloride for use in producing sodium carbonate. Anhydrous calcium chloride has been approved by the FDA as a packaging aid to ensure dryness (CPG 7117.02).

The hydrated salt can be dried for re-use but will dissolve in its own water of hydration if heated quickly and form a hard amalgamated solid when cooled.

Other applications

Calcium chloride is used in concrete mixes to accelerate the initial setting, but chloride ions lead to corrosion of steel rebar, so it should not be used in reinforced concrete. The anhydrous form of calcium chloride may also be used for this purpose and can provide a measure of the moisture in concrete.

Calcium chloride is included as an additive in plastics and in fire extinguishers, in blast furnaces as an additive to control scaffolding (clumping and adhesion of materials that prevent the furnace charge from descending), and in fabric softener as a thinner.

The exothermic dissolution of calcium chloride is used in self-heating cans and heating pads.

In the oil industry, calcium chloride is used to increase the density of solids-free brines. It is also used to provide inhibition of swelling clays in the water phase of invert emulsion drilling fluids.

 acts as flux material, decreasing the melting point, in the Davy process for the industrial production of sodium metal through the electrolysis of molten NaCl.

Calcium chloride is also used in the production of activated charcoal.

Calcium chloride can be used to precipitate fluoride ions from water as insoluble .

Calcium chloride is also an ingredient used in ceramic slipware. It suspends clay particles so that they float within the solution, making it easier to use in a variety of slipcasting techniques.

Calcium chloride dihydrate (20 percent by weight) dissolved in ethanol (95 percent ABV) has been used as a sterilant for male animals. The solution is injected into the testes of the animal. Within one month, necrosis of testicular tissue results in sterilization.

Cocaine producers in Colombia import tons of calcium chloride to recover solvents that are on the INCB Red List and are more tightly controlled.

Metal reduction flux 
Similarly,  is used as a flux and electrolyte in the FFC Cambridge electrolysis process for titanium production, where it ensures the proper exchange of calcium and oxygen ions between the electrodes.

Hazards
Although non-toxic in small quantities when wet, the strongly hygroscopic properties of the non-hydrated salt present some hazards. Calcium chloride can act as an irritant by desiccating moist skin. Solid calcium chloride dissolves exothermically, and burns can result in the mouth and esophagus if it is ingested. Ingestion of concentrated solutions or solid products may cause gastrointestinal irritation or ulceration.

Consumption of calcium chloride can lead to hypercalcemia.

Properties

Calcium chloride dissolves in water, producing chloride and the aquo complex . In this way, these solutions are sources of "free" calcium and free chloride ions. This description is illustrated by the fact that these solutions react with phosphate sources to give a solid precipitate of calcium phosphate:

Calcium chloride has a very high enthalpy change of solution, indicated by considerable temperature rise accompanying dissolution of the anhydrous salt in water. This property is the basis for its largest-scale application.

Molten calcium chloride can be electrolysed to give calcium metal and chlorine gas:

Preparation

In much of the world, calcium chloride is derived from limestone as a by-product of the Solvay process, which follows the net reaction below:

North American consumption in 2002 was 1,529,000 tonnes (3.37 billion pounds). In the US, most of calcium chloride is obtained by purification from brine. As with most bulk commodity salt products, trace amounts of other cations from the alkali metals and alkaline earth metals (groups 1 and 2) and other anions from the halogens (group 17) typically occur.

Occurrence
Calcium chloride occurs as the rare evaporite minerals sinjarite (dihydrate) and antarcticite (hexahydrate). Another natural hydrate known is ghiaraite – a tetrahydrate. The related minerals chlorocalcite (potassium calcium chloride) and tachyhydrite (calcium magnesium chloride) are also very rare. So is true for rorisite, CaClF (calcium chloride fluoride).

See also 
 Calcium(I) chloride
 Calcium chloride transformation
 Magnesium chloride

References

External links

International Chemical Safety Card 1184
Product and Application Information (Formerly Dow Chemical Calcium Chloride division)
Report on steel corrosion by chloride including CaCl2 
Collection of calcium chloride reports and articles
Calcium chloride, Anhydrous MSDS
Difusivity of calcium chloride
Centers for Disease Control and Prevention, National Institutes of Occupational Safety and Health, "Calcium Chloride (anhydrous)" 

Calcium compounds
Chlorides
Alkaline earth metal halides
Deliquescent substances
Desiccants
Pyrotechnic colorants
Edible salt
E-number additives
Concrete admixtures